Gorgeous Enterprises is a London-based film production company co-founded by Chris Palmer, Frank Budgen, and Paul Rothwell.  The company works largely in the production of television advertisements, feature films, and music videos.  It was formed by Chris Palmer in 1996, but legally became a new company in 1997 when Budgen and Rothwell joined the partnership.

Links
Gorgeous Enterprises Website

References 

Mass media companies established in 1996
Film production companies of the United Kingdom